Varduhi Yeritsyan (born in 1981) is a Franco-Armenian classical pianist.

Born in Yerevan in a family of musicians (her father and mother are pianists), she naturally studied this instrument in a specialized school, from which she graduated at 16 with the first prize. She then entered the Komitas State Conservatory of Yerevan where she studied in particular with Mikhaïl Voskressenski and Victor Merzhanov for there years. In 2002, she moved to France and continued her studies at the Conservatoire de Paris, in Brigitte Engerer's class. She has since played in many concerts, mainly in France, and in Europe.

External links 
 Varduhi Yeritsyan's official website
 Interview with Varduhi Yeritsyan (Pianobleu)
 Varduhi Yeritsyan on the site of the Conservatoire de Paris
 Varduhi Yeritsyan - Prokofiev Sarcasmes

21st-century French women classical pianists
Armenian classical pianists
Armenian women pianists
Musicians from Yerevan
1981 births
Living people
Conservatoire de Paris alumni
Women classical pianists